The 1936 World Archery Championships was the 6th edition of the event. It was held in Prague, Czechoslovakia on 13–17 August 1936 and was organised by World Archery Federation (FITA).

Medals summary

Recurve

Medals table

References

External links
 World Archery website
 Complete results

World Championship
World Archery
A
World Archery Championships